The mixed team recurve archery competition at the 2018 Asian Games was held from 21 to 27 August at Gelora Bung Karno Archery Field.

A total of 24 teams participated in the ranking round to determine the seeds for knockout round. Ranking round classification was ranked based on the combined score of the best men and women archer in the individual ranking round.

Schedule
All times are Western Indonesia Time (UTC+07:00)

Results 
Legend
DNS — Did not start

Ranking round

Knockout round

Bracket

Finals

Top half

Bottom half

1/16 eliminations

1/8 eliminations

Quarterfinals

Semifinals

Bronze medal match

Gold medal match

References

External links
Official website

Mixed team recurve